Cool Nights is a 1991 studio album by American jazz vibraphonist Gary Burton. Burton is featured with tenor saxophonist Bob Berg, guitarist Wolfgang Muthspiel, bassist Will Lee and drummer Peter Erskine.

Background 
The album was recorded in the Studio A of the Power Station in New York City. In the accompanying booklet the record label explains that Burton's music in this album changed direction. This time Burton wanted to play something closer to music of such famous jazz names as Nat King Cole, Louis Armstrong, Billie Holiday, Ella Fitzgerald, Sarah Vaughan, and Carmen McRae. Burton's friend Pat Metheny did not play for this album but wrote four of the eleven songs.

Track listing

Personnel
Gary Burton – vibraphone 
Will Lee – bass, percussion
Peter Erskine – drums, percussion
Wolfgang Muthspiel – guitar 
Bob James – keyboards 
Bob Berg – tenor saxophone

References

External links and sources

1991 albums
Gary Burton albums